From September 8 to 14, 2004, Hurricane Ivan moved through the Caribbean Sea, affecting all of the Greater Antilles. It first lashed the southern coasts of Puerto Rico and Hispaniola with high waves, killing five people in the Dominican Republic and Haiti; in the latter country, two others drowned due to storm flooding. The effects in Jamaica were among the worst from a tropical cyclone in the island's recorded history. The storm caused severe damage which left 18,000 people homeless. An estimated 17 people on the island were killed by Ivan.

Preparations
On September 8, Hurricane Ivan crossed Grenada into the eastern Caribbean Sea. That day, a tropical storm watch was issued for the southern Dominican Republic from Santo Domingo to the country's border with Haiti. A hurricane watch also issued for the southern Haiti coastline, as well as for Jamaica. On September 9, a hurricane warning was issued for Jamaica and the Cayman Islands, a tropical storm warning was issued for western Haiti, and a hurricane watch was issued for southwestern Dominican Republic. Hurricane Ivan passed just south of Jamaica on September 11 and just south of the Cayman Islands on the next day. By September 11, all of western Cuba, including Isla de la Juventud, was under a hurricane warning, and Ivan passed just southwest of the western tip of Cuba on September 14.

The World Health Organization and the Pan American Health Organization distributed four emergency kits to southern Haiti due to Ivan's threat, capable of covering basic needs for 10,000 people each. One flight from Port-au-Prince to Miami was canceled because of the storm, and shelters were opened in Nippes, housing 4,000 people.

About 500,000 Jamaicans were told to evacuate from coastal areas. Jamaican Prime Minister P.J. Patterson declared a public emergency, saying that the nation had to "prepare for the worst-case scenario". Schools and churches were converted into shelters, and the national blood bank requested residents to donate blood, in anticipation of potential injuries. By September 10, over 1,000 individual shelters were set up throughout the country.  The Jamaican Government urged off-duty corrections officers to report to work. Air Jamaica canceled all flights to and from the island, as well as inter-island flights; aircraft were transported to the United States until the storm passed. The Mennonite Central Committee designated the equivalence of US$20,000 for assisting with potential damage. Businesses in Kingston were closed, and fishermen secured their boats to trees. Workers boarded up windows, and grocery stores remained open later than normal to allow for residents to purchase supplies.

Officials in the Cayman Islands coordinated the distribution of information about Ivan with the media, the Meteorological Service, and the National Hurricane Committee of the Cayman. As a result, people evacuated the territory or sought refuge in emergency shelters. Cuban media broadcast weather bulletins directly from the Cuban National Forecasting Centre. President Fidel Castro appeared in TV programming about the storm. Nationwide, 2,266,068 people evacuated due to the threat from Hurricane Ivan, about 60% of whom to the houses of relatives. The extensive preparations was credited for the zero death toll during the hurricane.

Puerto Rico and Hispaniola
It generated high waves that washed rocks and debris ashore southern Puerto Rico near Salinas. A portion of Highway 109 was closed for 12 hours at Las Ochenta due to debris. Along the southern coast of the Dominican Republic, high waves killed four people. Strong surf also affected the southern coast of Haiti, causing damage to the port and wrecking three houses at Jacmel. High waves killed one person, while two people drowned in floodwaters after refusing to evacuate their house. Heavy storm rainfall, which reached  at Les Cayes, flooded irrigation channels along the Artibonite River in Haiti. Throughout Haiti, Ivan damaged or destroyed the houses of 2,500 people, mostly on the Tiburon Peninsula.

Jamaica
The storm turned westward before affecting the island, and an eyewall replacement cycle weakened the intensity slightly, keeping the strongest Category 4 winds offshore. On Pedro Bank, located southwest of Jamaica, an anemometer recorded winds of  averaged over ten minutes, before the instrument stopped reporting. Ivan dropped torrential rainfall across the island that damaged rain gauges in southern Jamaica.

Throughout Jamaica, Hurricane Ivan killed 17 people and left $575 million in damage. Hurricane-force winds affected the entire island, while heavy rainfall triggered mudslides and flooding. The storm destroyed 5,600 houses and damaged another 41,400, and most of the island's utilities were damaged.

The storm was described as one of the most intense hurricanes in Jamaica's recorded history. Ivan caused severe damage, damaging and destroying houses, and triggering mudslides that washed out roads. In Kingston, the winds downed trees and poles and caused flooding. Roads suffered flooding, and part of the A1 Road, the primary northern coastal highway, was washed away. Along the coast,  were reported, and in Kingston, several large trees were brought down. Tiles on the Jamaica Pegasus Hotel were blown off and broken, and waves flooded a causeway to an airport near Kingston that was closed and evacuated.

Due to a shift Ivan's track, the capital city of Kingston was spared from extreme damage. However, flooding in the city was deemed a "major catastrophe". Some roads throughout the region were left impassible due to downed trees and utility poles. The majority of tourism and resort areas suffered "mainly cosmetic damage and all structures remained primarily intact". In the aftermath of the storm, looters were reported roaming the streets of Jamaica's capital city, Kingston, robbing emergency workers at gunpoint. Overall, Ivan left 18,000 people homeless as a result of the flood waters and high winds.

Cayman Islands
The  storm surge, in addition to waves  waves, submerged nearly all of Grand Cayman, except for the extreme northeastern portion of the island. Owen Roberts International Airport and several homes were inundated by the floodwaters from the surge. Rainfall also reached  on Grand Cayman.

During the storm, meteorologists from Jamaica used satellite telephones to take over issuing warnings for the Cayman Islands, after the archipelago was severely damaged. The extensive storm preparations was credited with a low death toll of two people, despite the intense winds and flooding. Damage in the territory was estimated at $3.5 billion. Despite building codes similar to southern Florida, the strong winds damaged or destroyed 95% of buildings.

Cuba

Although the center of Ivan had pass through the Yucatán Channel as a Category 5 hurricane, its core approached within  of Cape San Antonio, the westernmost point of Cuba, which briefly experienced the edge of the eyewall. Tropical storm-force winds extended  from Cape San Antonio into Artemisa Province and Isla de la Juventud, lasting 47 hours at the latter location while the hurricane passed  to the southwest. A  storm surge washed ashore the southern coast, causing flooding along the coast and in low-lying areas. The surge first affected Granma and Santiago de Cuba provinces while Ivan was south of Jamaica. The offshore island of Cayo Largo del Sur recorded  during the storm.

Throughout Cuba, Hurricane Ivan left $1.223 billion in damage, but no deaths. The storm caused widespread damage to crops, power systems, and homes. In Santiago de Cuba in the eastern portion of the country, heavy rainfall caused landslides. In western Pinar del Río Province, Ivan's strong winds shredded the roofs of several homes. The heavy rainfall flooded houses and farms, causing mudslides that cut off two houses.

See also

Hurricane Allen – powerful storm that traversed the Caribbean Sea
Effects of Hurricane Dean in the Greater Antilles – effects from a similarly powerful hurricane in 2007

References

Lesser Antilles
Ivan
Ivan
Ivan
Ivan
Ivan
Ivan
2004 in Jamaica
Ivan
Ivan Greater Antilles